Bottle service is the sale of liquor by the bottle in mostly North American lounges and nightclubs.

The purchase of bottle service typically includes a reserved table for the patron's party and mixers of the patron's choice. Bottle service can include the service of a VIP host, who will ensure that patrons have sufficient mixers and will often make drinks using the patrons' liquor bottle and mixers. The purchase of bottle service sometimes results in cover charge being waived for the purchaser's party and often allows patrons to bypass entrance lines. The gratuity is also often added automatically but portions of that go to security, porters, and back-of-the-house staff, in addition to the VIP host who serves the patron.

The cost of a bottle at such a lounge or club is usually significantly marked up, often by 1,000 percent or more, and can account for a significant portion of an establishment's revenue.

History
Early forms of bottle service existed in World War II era Japan, where unfinished bottles would be stored. In its modern form, an early example was in 1988 at the Paris nightclub Les Bains Douches, bottle service was introduced to deal with an excess of customer demand. An early, inexpensive form of bottle service ($90, compared with $6 drinks) was established at the Tunnel in New York City in 1993 (by Jeffrey Jah and Mark Baker). The modern form of bottle service was pioneered in 1995 by  Michael Ault at Spy Bar and in 1996, Chaos ($175 for a bottle of Stolichnaya vodka), with the goal of creating a "barrier to entry", rather than of increasing liquor sales.

The concept later spread to other American cities, notably Miami and Las Vegas in the early 2000s.

Criticism
The cost of bottle service and the central position provided to purchasers of bottle service has led some critics to complain that bottle service is turning night clubs into elitist dens. Preferential treatment for purchasers of bottle service may include stopping the regular dance music when an especially expensive bottle is purchased and, instead, playing a theme song, or removing patrons from a table to make way for another patron and their party that purchased bottle service.

See also
 Conspicuous consumption

References

Nightlife
Drinking culture